Nicole Corinne Remund (born 31 December 1989) is a Swiss football defender, currently playing for FC Zürich. She is a member of the Swiss national team since 2008.

References

External links
 Profile at FC Zürich 

1989 births
Living people
Swiss women's footballers
Switzerland women's international footballers
2015 FIFA Women's World Cup players
Footballers from Zürich
Swiss Women's Super League players
FC Zürich Frauen players
Women's association football defenders
21st-century Swiss women